The Women's 200 metre individual medley competition of the 2018 FINA World Swimming Championships (25 m) was held on 15 December 2018.

Records
Prior to the competition, the existing world and championship records were as follows.

Results

Heats
The heats were started on 15 December at 9:36.

Final
The final was held on 15 December at 19:07.

References

Women's 200 metre individual medley